Matthew Russell Rolston is an American artist, photographer, director and creative director, known for his lighting techniques and detailed approach to art direction and design. Rolston has been identified throughout his career with the revival and modern expression of Hollywood glamour.

Rolston's career spans the areas of photography, film, creative direction, experiential design (including hospitality development), branding, product design, fine art, publishing and arts education.

Photography career
Born in Los Angeles, Rolston studied painting and drawing at the Chouinard Art Institute and Otis College of Art and Design, and in the Bay Area at the San Francisco Art Institute. He also studied drawing, photography and imaging, and filmmaking at ArtCenter College of Design in Pasadena, California. There, in 2006, he received an honorary doctorate.

While still a student at ArtCenter, Rolston received an assignment from American artist Andy Warhol, for Warhol's celebrity focused Interview magazine, which served as his "discovery". Thereafter, he began a successful career in photography. Rolston began shooting covers and editorial assignments for founding editor Jann Wenner of Rolling Stone, as well as for other publications such as Harper's Bazaar, Vogue, Vanity Fair, W and The New York Times Magazine. Rolston has completed thousands of photoshoots in his career, including over 100 covers for Rolling Stone.

Rolston's images have been exhibited at institutions and museums in solo and group shows including Beauty CULTure (with Lauren Greenfield, Herb Ritts, Andres Serrano, and Carrie Mae Weems, 2011), The Annenberg Space for Photography, Los Angeles, California; The Warhol Look: Glamour, Style, Fashion (curated by Mark Francis and Margery King), The Whitney Museum of American Art, New York (1997); and Fashion and Surrealism, FIT Gallery, New York, 1987 (traveled to the Victoria & Albert Museum, London, UK, 1988).

A series of monographs have been published of Rolston's works including Big Pictures, A Book of Photographs (1991), a selection of images from the artist's first decade as a photographer, with an introduction by American film director Tim Burton. It was published by Bulfinch Press, New York. 

beautyLIGHT, Pictures at a Magazine (2008), is a survey of more than twenty years of Rolston's editorial portraits. It was published by teNeues, Germany. 

Talking Heads: The Vent Haven Portraits (2012), is a fine art series consisting of large color portraits of ventriloquist dummies held in a rare museum collection. It was published by Pointed Leaf Press, New York. 

Hollywood Royale: Out of the School of Los Angeles (2017), is a retrospective capturing the artist’s work in mid-career. It was published by teNeues, Germany. 

In 2021, Laguna Art Museum published Matthew Rolston, Art People: The Pageant Portraits, an exhibition catalog.

Rolston's works are in the permanent collections of the Los Angeles County Museum of Art, the Museum of Modern Art, New York, and the National Portrait Gallery (Donald W. Reynolds Center for American Art and Portraiture at The Smithsonian, Washington D.C.).

Film career
Rolston has also conceived, written and directed numerous film projects, having overseen over 100 music videos and 200 television commercials in his career, including collaborations with artists as diverse as Madonna, Janet Jackson, Beyoncé Knowles, and Miley Cyrus, as well as numerous advertising campaigns - both print and television - for clients such as L'Oreal, Revlon, Estée Lauder, Clairol, Levi's, Pantene, Elizabeth Arden, Gap and Polo Ralph Lauren, among others.

Rolston established a documentary production unit called ‘R-ROLL’, a verbal play on industry reference to ‘B-roll’, that is – the capturing of behind-the-scenes footage. The ‘R’ is for Rolston. Added Rolston: “there's an overwhelming demand for filmed content, as clients expand their reach beyond traditional media."

R-ROLL has produced projects for Time, Inc., Amazon.com, ESPN, A&E/Lifetime Networks, SBE Entertainment Group and Virgin Hotels among others. Said Rolston, "We're now entering an era where the ‘making of' is just as important as the ‘of'. And clients seem to enjoy the integration of our media services. Print, film, design, documentary, you might say we're a ‘one-stop-shop'."

Rolston has appeared as a guest expert on a spectrum of beauty-oriented broadcast programs, from Bravo's Shear Genius and Make Me a Supermodel to the CW's America's Next Top Model.

Hospitality 
Rolston expanded into creative direction and branding, developing projects in experiential design, including hospitality projects and product design. 

Hospitality clients have included Mahmood Khimji's Highgate Holdings, Sam Nazarian's SBE Entertainment Group, Richard Branson's Virgin Hotels and Barry Sternlicht's SH Hotels & Resorts.

Fine art

Rolston has created four photographic fine art projects that have led to a series of publications and exhibitions:

Talking Heads: The Vent Haven Portraits consists of monumentally scaled color portraits of ventriloquial figures housed in the Vent Haven Museum in Fort Mitchell, Kentucky. This was Rolston's first self-assigned photographic series and debuted at Diane Rosenstein Fine Art in Los Angeles. It has since travelled to venues in Miami and Berlin, among others. Rolston's third published monograph accompanied the exhibition.

Hollywood Royale: Out of the School of Los Angeles - which includes Rolston's fourth monograph, as well as a travelling exhibition - is a retrospective of his editorial portraits from 1977 to 1993. Edited by long-time Los Angeles–based gallerist and curator David Fahey, this series presents an array of portraits that capture the 1980s and its myriad talents. From Michael Jackson and Madonna, to Prince, George Michael and Cyndi Lauper, the selection of images reflects the era.

Art People: The Pageant Portraits is a series of emotionally-intimate portraits of participants in “Pageant of the Masters", a tableaux vivants entertainment that is part of an annual arts festival held in Laguna Beach, California. The project features dramatically scaled color prints; one installation alone is over thirty feet wide. Ralph Pucci International first exhibited this series in its Los Angeles gallery in 2017, and this work became Rolston's first solo institutional exhibition on the West Coast when it opened Summer 2021 at Laguna Art Museum.

Vanitas: The Palermo Portraits, as yet unpublished, is another dramatically scaled color portrait series, this depicting Christian mummies housed in the Capuchin Catacombs of Sicily. The project is, according to Rolston "a meditation on mortality"; it represents the artist's continuing evolution as a photographer and is an attempt to elevate his portraiture to a conceptual level.

Rolston has stated his purpose with art-making is to "pose questions about the things that make us most human."

Teaching 
In 1998, Rolston established the Matthew Rolston Scholarship for Film and Creative Direction at ArtCenter College of Design. Said Rolston, “the scholarship is intended to promote cross-disciplinary studies between film and other creative practices”.

In 2015 Rolston became an adjunct professor and curricular advisor to ArtCenter College’s Undergraduate and Graduate Film Departments and continues to lecture and mentor there in the fields of marketing and communications strategy, fashion communications, luxury branding and public service messaging. At ArtCenter, Rolston teaches two original courses which he conceived of and wrote. The first, centering on marketing communications, is called The Power of Pleasure. And the second class, named Conscious Communication, centers on messaging in the public interest. Rolston's classes are situated within ArtCenter's Film program, however they invite members from diverse disciplines including advertising and creative direction, photography and imaging, fine art, and other courses of study offered at the college. 

Within the structure of the classes, students create short form films in an atmosphere similar to that of a professional communications agency with Rolston acting as instructor, mentor and creative director and the students enacting the roles of individual writer/director ‘makers’.

An illustrated textbook of Rolston's The Power of Pleasure, based on his original syllabus and lectures, is currently under development.

Books
Matthew Rolston, Art People: The Pageant Portraits – Lucia | Marquand, published by Laguna Art Museum, 2021
 Hollywood Royale: Out of the School of Los Angeles – teNeues, 2017
 Talking Heads: The Vent Haven Portraits – Pointed Leaf Press, 2012
 beautyLIGHT: Pictures at a Magazine – teNeues, 2008
 Big Pictures: A Book of Photographs – A Bulfinch Press Book, 1991
James Danziger: Visual Aid – Pantheon, October 12, 1986.
Andy Warhol, Pat Hackett: The Andy Warhol Diaries – Warner Books, May 1989, p. 599-600ss.
Mark Francis, Margery King: The Warhol Look: Glamour Style Fashion – Bulfinch, October 1997, p. 246, 252-253ss.
Steve Reiss, Neil Feineman: Thirty Frames Per Second: The Visionary Art of the Music Video – Harry N. Abrams, October 1, 2000, p. 26, 206-211ss.
 Henry Keazor, Thorsten Wübbena: Video Thrills The Radio Star. Musikvideos: Geschichte, Themen, Analysen – Bielefeld 2005, p. 27ss.
Sarah Mower: 20 Years Dolce & Gabbana – Slp edition, 5Continents, November 2005.
Trey Laird: Individuals: Portraits from the Gap Collection – Melcher Media, October 30, 2006, p. 37, 59, 82, 94, 98, 104, 120, 230ss.
Justyn Barnes, Nate Giorgio, David Nordahl Jordan Sommers: The Official Michael Jackson Opus – OPUS Media Group, December 7, 2009, "The Last Sitting," p. 242-247ss.
Charles Churchward: Herb Ritts: The Golden Hour: A Photographer's Life and His World – Rizzoli, October 26, 2010, p. 74-77, 79, 82–83, 99, 130, 207, 295, 311ss.
Kathy Ryan: The New York Times Magazine Photographs – Thames & Hudson, September 30, 2011, p. 304-305ss.
Derek Blasberg: Harper's Bazaar: Models – Abrams, October 13, 2015, p. 214-215ss.
Josh Baker, Allen Jones: Naomi Campbell – Collector's Edition, TASCHEN, 2016.
Steven M. Price: Trousdale Estates: Midcentury to Modern in Beverly Hills – Regan Arts, January 2017, p. 120-125ss.
Joan Juliet Buck: The Price of Illusion: A Memoir – Illustrated Edition, Atria Books, March 2017, p. 158, Plate Section Two (p. 5)ss. 
Claudia Campaña: Michael Jackson: Artes visuales y símbolos – Metales pesados, Ediciones, 2018, p. 14-16ss.
Tim Street Porter, Annie Kelly: Splash: The Art of the Swimming Pool – Illustrated Edition, Rizzoli, April 2019, p. 4 (dedication), 216-217ss.
Ruth Reichl: Save Me the Plums: My Gourmet Memoir – Random House, April 2019, p. 165-166ss.
Paige Powell: Paige Powell: Beulah Land – Dashwood Books, May 2019, p. 229.
Sara Dallin, Keren Woodward: Really Saying Something: Sara & Keren – Our Banarama Story – Hutchinson, October 2020, Plate Section One, p. 10
Enrico Bernardo: The Impossible Collection of Champagne: The 100 Most Exceptional Bottles from Champagne – Assouline, October 2022,  p. 100-101ss.

Honors and awards 
 2015 Variety & WWD StyleMaker Awards, The Smashbox Visual Impact Award
 2009 Pacific Design Center's Stars of Design Award, Honors in the Field of Photography
 2008 Hollywood Life Magazine's Hollywood Style Awards, Visionary Lens Master
 2008 17th Annual MVPA Awards, Winner, Best Direction, Pop Video of the Year ("Candyman," Christina Aguilera)
 2007 38th NAACP Image Awards, Outstanding Music Video Award ("Be Without You," Mary J. Blige)
 2007 MTV Video Music Awards, Nominee, Best Direction ("Candyman," Christina Aguilera)
 2006 Honorary Doctorate, ArtCenter College of Design, Pasadena, CA
 1999 AICP Awards, Award for Advertising Excellence ("Khakis Swing," The GAP)
 1999 AICP Awards, Award for Visual Style ("Khakis Swing," The GAP)
 1992 MTV Video Music Awards, Nominee, Best Direction ("My Lovin," En Vogue)

References

External links

Matthew Rolston Official Website
 Art People
 Hollywood Royale
 Talking Heads
 beautyLight
 Vanitas
 Four Eleven Agency
 Fahey / Klein Gallery
 CAMERA WORK Photogalerie
 Laguna Art Museum / Art People
 ArtCenter/Change Lab Podcast
 ArtCenter/The Power of Pleasure
 ArtCenter/Conscious Communication
 Monocle "The Big Interview" Podcast

1955 births
Living people
People from Los Angeles
American music video directors
American photographers
Fashion photographers
Chouinard Art Institute alumni
Otis College of Art and Design alumni
San Francisco Art Institute alumni